Ryan T. Murphy (born 1971) has been the associate music director of The Tabernacle Choir at Temple Square since 2009, working with music director Mack Wilberg. Murphy's previous positions have included directing choirs at the New England Conservatory of Music and the Walnut Hill School for the Arts. He has also been music director at the Tuacahn Amphitheatre and Center for the Arts and the Sundance Institute in Provo.

Additionally, Murphy has been the director and conductor of the Chorale at Temple Square since 2009. The chorale trains and teaches musically its students prior to them officially becoming members of the Tabernacle Choir.

A native of Newtown, Connecticut, Murphy attended Brigham Young University (BYU), where he received bachelor's (1997) and master's (2002) degrees. In 2009, he received a doctorate in choral conducting from Boston University. As a BYU student, Murphy served as an assistant to then-BYU professor Wilberg.

From 1990 to 1992, Murphy served as a missionary of the Church of Jesus Christ of Latter-day Saints in the France Paris Mission.

He and his wife, Jennifer, are the parents of four children.

References

American Latter Day Saints
Living people
People from Newtown, Connecticut
Brigham Young University alumni
Boston University College of Fine Arts alumni
Musicians from Utah
Tabernacle Choir music directors
1971 births
American Mormon missionaries in France
20th-century Mormon missionaries